Sneisen is a village in the municipality of Malvik in Trøndelag county, Norway. Mostadmark Chapel is located in the village.

References

Villages in Trøndelag
Malvik